Maksim Flunovich Galiullin (born 1 April 1988) is a former Russian professional football player.

Club career
He played two seasons in the Russian Football National League for FC Ural Yekaterinburg.

External links
 Career summary by Sportbox
 

1988 births
Living people
Russian footballers
Association football forwards
FC Ural Yekaterinburg players
FC Dynamo Barnaul players
FC Gornyak Uchaly players